George Campbell (August 13, 1884 – February 21, 1952) was a Scottish-Canadian soccer player.

Career 
The nephew of Scottish international John Campbell (capped once in 1880),  Campbell began playing with Renfrew Victoria in the Scottish junior leagues. He later emigrated to Canada where in 1904 he played with Toronto Thistles. Throughout his tenure with Toronto Thistles he won the Ontario Cup in 1905, 1906, 1907, and 1909. In 1918, he signed with Toronto Scottish and played in the Inter-City League and later in the National Soccer League. His achievements with Toronto Scottish included the Challenge Trophy in 1921, and further Ontario Cups in 1918, 1921, and 1922.

He was inducted as a player into The Soccer Hall of Fame (Canada) in 2000. On May 24, 2012, he was selected as the Soccer Hall of Fame's Best XI team in 50 Years from 1912 to 1962.

International career 
Campbell made his debut for the Canada men's national soccer team on June 27, 1925 against the United States in a friendly match.

References

External links
 / Canada Soccer Hall of Fame

1884 births
1952 deaths
Scottish emigrants to Canada
Footballers from Glasgow
Canadian soccer players
Scottish footballers
Association football fullbacks
Canada men's international soccer players
Toronto Scottish players
Canadian National Soccer League players
Scottish Junior Football Association players
Renfrew Victoria F.C. players